i-Tree is a collection of urban and rural forestry analysis and benefits assessment tools.  It was designed and developed by the United States Forest Service to quantify and value ecosystem services provided by trees including pollution removal, carbon sequestration, avoided carbon emissions, avoided stormwater runoff, and more. i-Tree provides baseline data so that the growth of trees can be followed over time, and is used for planning purposes. Different tools within the i-Tree Suite use different types of inputs and provide different kinds of reports; some tools use a 'bottom up' approach based on tree inventories on the ground, while other tools use a 'top down' approach based on remote sensing data. i-Tree is peer-reviewed and has a process of ongoing collaboration to improve it.

There are seven different i-Tree applications which can enhance an individual's or organization's understanding of the benefits which trees provide in modern society. Over the course of many years the U.S. Forest Service has developed and refined these different applications: i-Tree Eco, i-Tree Landscape, i-Tree Hydro, i-Tree Design, i-Tree Canopy, i-Tree Species, and i-Tree MyTree.

History

i-Tree began in 2002 as survey of a sample of urban forest to simulate taking a tree inventory of an entire urban forest.  It then added hand held devices for efficient inventory of street trees.  The current version of i-Tree includes different tools which allow for several sources of data to be used, such as National Land Cover Data, Google Maps, and tree inventories. Some tools use continuous data on air pollution and meteorology for more accurate results.

Research 

Researchers using i-Tree have examined:

 The benefits of urban trees 
 Selecting the best tree planting locations 
 Storm damage to urban forests
 Potential bird habitats
 PM2.5 removal and health effect

References

Notes

Bibliography

External links 

 
 Center for Urban Forest Research

Environmental science software
Forest modelling
Natural resources
Urban forestry